The Kiss is a 1914 Vitagraph silent drama short motion picture starring Margaret Gibson, George Holt, William Desmond Taylor, and Myrtle Gonzalez.

Directed by Ulysses Davis, the screenplay was based on a story by Marc Edmund Jones. Long thought to have been a lost film, a copy was found and put on YouTube. The film is the only known surviving film in which director William Desmond Taylor appears as an actor. In 1964 Taylor's co-star Margaret Gibson, shortly before her death, reportedly confessed to having murdered him in 1922.

Cast
Margaret Gibson ... Alice, a shop girl
George Holt ... Fred, her sweetheart
William Desmond Taylor ... George Dale, society man
Myrtle Gonzalez ... Helen, George's fiancée
Loyola O'Connor ... Landlady
Jane Novak ... Mazie, a saleslady

References

External links

The Kiss with William Desmond Taylor and Margaret Gibson

1914 films
American silent short films
American black-and-white films
Vitagraph Studios short films
1914 drama films
1914 short films
Silent American drama films
1910s rediscovered films
Rediscovered American films
1910s American films
American drama short films